Alix of Mâcon (died 1260), was a Countess regnant suo jure of Mâcon in 1224–1239.

References

 Monumenta Germaniae Historica, tomus XXIII: Chronica Albrici Monachi Trium Fontium, anno 1222, pag. 912

Counts of Mâcon
1260 deaths
13th-century women rulers
Year of birth unknown